Maurecourt is a commune in the Yvelines department in the Île-de-France region in north-central France.

Education
Schools include:
École maternelle Chantebelle
École élémentaire La Cerisaie
École élémentaire Les Tilleuls

See also
Communes of the Yvelines department

References

External links

Official Site

Communes of Yvelines
Cergy-Pontoise